Standards in the warez scene are defined by groups of people who have been involved in its activities for several years and have established connections to large groups. These people form a committee, which creates drafts for approval of the large groups. Outside the warez scene, often referred to as p2p, there are no global rules similar to the scene, although some groups and individuals could have their own internal guidelines they follow.

In warez distribution, all releases must follow these predefined standards to become accepted material.
The standards committee usually cycles several drafts and finally decides which is best suited for the purpose, and then releases the draft for approval.
Once the draft has been e-signed by several bigger groups, it becomes ratified and accepted as the current standard.
There are separate standards for each category of releases. 
All groups are expected to know and follow the standards.

What is defined
There are rules of naming and organizing files, rules that dictate how a file must be packaged and an nfo file, that contains required information, must be added with the content.

Format
The first part of a standards document usually defines the format properties for the material, like codec, bitrate, resolution, file type and file size. Creators of the standard usually do comprehensive testing to find optimal codecs and settings for sound and video to maximize image quality in the selected file size.

When choosing file size, the limiting factor is the size of the media to be used (such as 700MB for CD-R). The standards are designed such that a certain amount of content will fit on each piece of media, with the best possible quality in terms of size. If more discs are required for sufficient quality, the standard will define the circumstances where it is acceptable to expand to a second or third disc. Newer video standards moved away from the size constraints and replaced them with a quality based alternative such as the use of CRF.

New codecs are usually tested annually to check if any offer any conclusive enhancement in quality or compression time. In general, quality is not sacrificed for speed, and the standards will usually opt for the highest quality possible, even if this takes much longer. For example, releases using the Xvid encoder must use the two-pass encoding method, which takes twice as long as a single pass, but achieves much higher quality; similarly, DVD-R releases that must be re-encoded often use 6 or 8 passes to get the best quality.

When choosing the file format, platform compatibility is important. Formats are chosen such that they can be used on any major platform with little hassle. Some formats such as CloneCD can only be used on Windows computers, and these formats are generally not chosen for use in the standards.

Packaging
Next, the standard usually talks about how to package the material. Allowed package formats today are limited to RAR and ZIP, of which the latter is used only in 0-day releases.

The sizes of the archives within the distributed file vary from the traditional 3½" floppy disk (1.44 MB) or extra-high density disk (2.88 MB) to 5 MB, 15 MB (typical for CD images) or 20 MB (typical for CD images of console releases), 50 MB files (typical for DVD images), and 100 MB (for dual-layer DVD images). These measurements are not equivalent to traditional measurement of file size (which is 1024 KB to a MB, 1024 MB to a GB); in a typical DVD release, each RAR file is exactly 50,000,000 bytes, not 52,428,800 bytes (50 megabytes in binary prefix).

Formerly, the size of volumes were limited by the RAR file naming scheme, which produced extensions .rar, .r00 and so on through .r99. This allowed for 101 volumes in a single release before the naming switched to s00, s01 and so on. For example, a DVD-R image (4.37 GiB), split into 101 pieces, produces volumes smaller than 50 MB. The new RAR naming format, name.part001.rar, removes the limit, although the individual split archives continue to be 50 MB for historical reasons and because the old RAR naming format is still being widely used.

Different compression levels are used for each type of material being distributed. The reason for this is that some material compresses much better than others. Movies and MP3 files are already compressed with near maximum capacity. Repacking them would just create larger files and increase decompression time. Ripped movies are still packaged due to the large file size, but compression is disallowed and the RAR format is used only as a container. Because of this, modern playback software can easily play a release directly from the packaged files, and even stream it as the release is downloaded (if the network is fast enough).

MP3 and music video releases are an exception in that they are not packaged into a single archive like almost all other sections. These releases have content that is not further compressible without loss of quality, but also have small enough files that they can be transferred reliably without breaking them up. Since these releases rarely have large numbers of files, leaving them unpackaged is more convenient and allows for easier scripting. For example, scripts can read ID3 information from MP3s and sort releases based on those contents.

Naming
Rules for naming files and folders are an important part of the standards. Correctly named folders make it easier to maintain clean archives and unique filenames allow dupecheck to work properly. There's a defined character set which can be used in naming of the folders. The selected character set is chosen to minimize problems due to the many platforms a release may encounter during its distribution. Since FTP servers, operating systems or file systems may not allow special characters in file or directory names, only a small set of characters is allowed. Substitutions are made where special characters would normally be used (e.g. ç replaced by c) or these characters are omitted, such as an apostrophe. This can happen automatically by site scripts. As a note, spaces are explicitly disallowed in current standards and are substituted with underscores or full stops.

The ubiquitous character set includes the upper- and lower-case English alphabet, numerals, and several basic punctuation marks. It is outlined below:

 ABCDEFGHIJKLMNOPQRSTUVWXYZ
 abcdefghijklmnopqrstuvwxyz
 0123456789-._()

A typical example of the folder name of a movie release would be:
 Title.Of.The.Movie.YEAR.Source.Codec-GROUP
The Xvid scene does not allow the use of parentheses and 
the BDR scene also doesn't allow the use of an underscore, 
while those are common with music releases. 
Dots aren't used in the required naming scheme for music videos. 
Square brackets aren't defined in any ruleset, however they are used by p2p groups that do not follow these rules. The best known example is aXXo.

Date
Standards documents have often a date defined when the rules take effect. The warez scene typically follows the UTC time standard. 
There is no formal record documenting correct times for all releases. Depending on geographical location and the timing of releases, release sites receive software releases at slightly different times. Release times in any single source may vary by as much as two weeks.

Consequences 

If a group violates a standard, the release will be nuked. Another group will often proper the release. 
This proper usually requires a sample or a detailed explanation to prove the flaw in the material, unless the flaw was clear enough for the release to be nuked at releasing time. Flaws that aren't immediately visible can be found during testing of the material, such as a broken crack or a bad serial. These sanctions are social in nature and can be initiated by anyone within the community.

Video standards

There are several standards to release movies, TV show episodes and other video material to the scene. VCD releases use the less efficient MPEG-1 format, are low quality, but can be played back on most standalone DVD players. SVCD releases use MPEG-2 encoding, have half the video resolution of DVDs and can also be played back on most DVD players. DVD-R releases use the same format as retail DVD-Videos, and are therefore larger in size. Finally DivX, Xvid, H.264/MPEG-4 AVC and recently HEVC releases use the much more efficient MPEG standards. Generally, only middle to top-end DVD players can play back DivX or Xvid files, while Blu-ray players are required to handle H.264 files.

There are many different formats because the whole thing was always a function of players, codec development and the pursuit of the best possible quality in terms of size. This results in a series of evolutionary stages and improvements that have been introduced gradually. The only film format that hasn't changed since the early days is the DVDR. The Scene still holds on to this format but it's becoming less important due to Blu-rays being the main source for retail releases.

VCD
Scene rules require the releasing group to spread theatrical VCDs in .bin/.cue files that can be burned on a CD. Although often the CD size is dictated by the length of the movie or video. One movie typically uses two CDs, although length may force the release to be a 3 or 4 CD release. The source of these theatrical releases is typically analog, such as CAM, telecine or telesync releases (movies recorded by a camera in theatres, often with external audio sources). VCDs from other sources such as DVD, VHS, TV, Pay-Per-View specials, Porn or Anime may also be released in the .mpg or .asf format. DVD and VHS rips are only allowed if there was no screener released before. The scene VCDs popped up in 1998, but digital unlicensed versions of films already appeared in early 1997 on private FTP networks. Eviliso, VCD-Europe, FTF and Immortal VCD are groups that have released VCD movies. In 1999 there were 15 to 20 groups.

Because of its low quality, VCD releases declined in favor of SVCD and XviD. VCDs are often larger than these higher quality files, making VCDs even less attractive. VCDs once used for music videos got their own set of standards on October 1, 2002.

SVCD
Scene rules require the releasing group to spread SVCDs in .bin/.cue files, that fit on 700 MiB CDs. One movie typically uses two CDs, although length may force the release to be a 3 or 4 CD release. Content source is sometimes analog, such as Cam, Telecine or telesync releases. Also R5, DVDSCR or retail DVD is used as SVCD source. The advantage of SVCD is that it can be played on any standalone DVD player, but when DivX-capable players are taking over the market and more bandwidth becomes available to download DVDRs, SVCD became obsolete. Around 2007, the stream of SVCD releases from the scene died out.

Standard definition video
Standard definition rips have a resolution that is lower than high-definition video.

DivX and Xvid for retail and bootleg sources

MPEG-4 release standards are set in the so-called TDX rules. The DivX codec originally gained popularity because it provided a good compromise between film quality and file size. Approximately 25% of the space occupied by DVD is enough for a DivX encode to have DVD quality output. The first standards were created by meetings and debates of Team DivX (TDX) in 2000. This group consisted of the leaders of the top 5 DivX releasing groups, topsite operators along with rippers and encoders. It was formed because they thought "the new Div/X scene was a bit unmoderated, sloppy and pretty much a free-for-all." iSONEWS published the first standards on April 26. Earlier, on March 16, the database started to carry a DivX section on their website. A week later Betanews noticed the popularity of the then recently released DivX codec throughout IRC channels and asked whether this was a new threat to DVD after the DeCSS utility. The 2001 revision of the standards were organized by different people from iSONEWS. It consisted of 15 groups and signed by 18. This was the last one of the listed rulesets covering pornography.

The once generally accepted TDX2002 ruleset requires movie releases to contain a DivX 3.11 or Xvid encoded video stream with an MP3 or AC3 encoded audio stream in an AVI container file. Movies are released in one, two or more 700 MiB files, so that they can be easily stored on CD-R. Two or four TV show episodes usually share one CD, hence 175 or 350 MiB releases are common. 233 MiB (three episodes per CD) are more rare but not forbidden, and are often used for full 30-minute programs with no adverts. 233 MiB is more used on whole season rips from retail sources or on single episodes that have a longer runtime. In July 2002, around the release of the new TDX2K2 ruleset, Xvid releases started to pop up. DivX with SBC was retired. VCDVaULT was the pioneer in promoting Xvid to the scene. In 2003, TheWretched believed it was time to update the standards again and a few tweaks were in order. Thereafter they found the lack of info groups put into the NFO inexcusable: It isn't only about the flashy ASCII art, the content matters.

The TDX2002 ruleset was followed by TXD2005. Because all DivX codecs are banned in this new ruleset, TDX became TXD: The XviD Releasing Standards. There is a rebuttal against this revision, proving it to be flawed in several aspects. Higher resolutions are not allowed. More efficient formats such as AVC and AAC have not been adopted yet, but are still being pushed by some release groups. There are also considerations to replace the old proprietary AVI file format with a modern container such as MP4 or MKV that can include multiple audio streams, subtitles and DVD-like menus. However, few standalone DVD players support these formats yet, and cross-platform playback is an important consideration. Nonetheless the introduction of MPEG-4 playback capabilities in standalone DVD players was a result of the huge amount of TDX-compliant movie material available on the internet.

The latest TXD revision is TXD2009. As with each revision, there are some major changes. Multiple CD releases aren't necessary anymore, but most release groups keep following the tradition. The maximum width of a rip is lowered back to 640px for WS releases, the movie length versus file size rules and many other sections of the ruleset are redefined or extended. 91 releasegroups have signed the rules. as with the 2005 standards, there is a rebuttal that aims to allow "SOME of the fuckups and insanity in the 2009 ruleset". While the 2005 rebuttal made some valid points, this one is regarded as being pointless by other sceners. The reason for lowering the resolution is that some cheap Xvid players don't fully support resolutions above 640px. The pixel aspect ratio goes bad and makes the movie unwatchable. Other points made in the rebuttal are too hard to enforce, while still being backed by the releasing groups, or that the TXD is mainly meant for retail sources. Not all rules can be enforced on non-retail sources.

DivX and Xvid for television sources
XviD used for standard definition English television releases has been a ruleless world. However, in 2002 a ruleset for VCD, SVCD and DivX/Xvid tries to cover up the mess a little. SDTV, PDTV, HDTV and their dupe rules were being defined. Nuking had always been an issue in the TV scene. In 2007, a document was released that "intended to bring a level playing field to the TV-XviD scene and attempt to put down some rules to end some of the controversy that has plagued us in recent years", but it was only a draft. On January 1, 2011, a rule set written specifically for UK TV was released, taking into consideration various factors which differ from other regions.

The introduction of HDTV and the availability of high-definition source material has resulted in the release of video files that exceed the maximum allowed resolution by the TDX rules, which anticipated DVD-Video rips as the ultimate source. Due to a missing standard these releases follow different rules. They are usually tagged as HR HDTV and use half the resolution of 1080i (960 × 540 px, vertically cropped to 528 or 544 px). Some releases also use a resolution of 1024 × 576 px to provide a proper aspect ratio of 16:9. Occasionally, shows (usually animated shows) aired in standard definition (PDTV) are often uploaded as HR (high resolution) PDTV using the H264 codec which offers much better compression than XviD, allowing a higher resolution in a file the same size as an XviD encoded video using a standard definition source.

x264 for retail sources
On October 17, 2013, the first standard definition ruleset for retail sources was released. A day later there was a revision that fixed some examples. The MKV container must be used. It is mandatory to support file streaming and playing from RARs. CRF must be used. A photograph as proof must be included. 81 groups signed the document.

x264 for television sources

On February 20, 2012, more than a year after the appearance of the first draft, the SD x264 TV Release Standards document was released with the goal to bring quality control back to the SD releases. According to the document x264 has become the most advanced H264 video encoder and compared to XviD it is able to provide higher quality and compression at greater SD resolutions. It also allows better control and transparency over encoding settings. With CRF (constant rate factor) in the mix it can be ensured that a diverse array of material will get the most appropriate bitrate and not arbitrary fixed file sizes. The video container must be MP4 and AAC is used for the audio. Thirteen groups, ASAP, BAJSKORV, C4TV, D2V, DiVERGE, FTP, KYR, LMAO, LOL, MOMENTUM, SYS, TLA and YesTV signed the document and began releasing TV shows in the new format.

FQM and 2HD indicated they will keep releasing XviD. FQM said it's pointless losing a lot of standalone compatibility for slightly higher quality when there's already even better quality available. 2HD agrees and a vocal minority of the torrent community is quite upset because the MP4 container isn't compatible with many DVD players and other devices, but most scene groups don't really care about BitTorrent. 
Softpedia writer Lucian Parfeni called this interesting phenomenon the angry pirate and wrote that a lot of BitTorrent users are very disappointed about the move, though quite a few have no idea why it happened. 
A second reason FQM provided was that partial files can't be played back but LOL wrote the next day that the streaming issues were solved. On March 29, an updated version of the rules were released. This time 22 groups supported the document. MP4Box became the recommended muxer because it has support for file streaming and playing from RARs. For encoding audio, FFmpeg and FAAC encoders are banned. 2HD announced on April 15, 2012, that they would be abandoning XviD as show seasons end, but later this changed to only the seasons of the bigger shows. A month after 2HD's first announcement FQM released their first x264 rip.

On April 3, 2016, the SD x264 TV Release Standard was updated with a new revision that "aims to update the standards from 2012 to standards suitable for 2016 and the future. Adding clarity and patching loopholes to once again allow for consistent and quality releases, which was the aim of this standard back in 2012." The video container in this revision was changed from mp4 to mkv which frustrated many users.

Xvid and x264 sport rips
On June 24, 2009, five groups released the first rule set specifically designed for x264 sport releases: TXSRS2K9. The idea was that the x264 encoder would be more suitable than Xvid. 
Some days after previewing the rule set, a rebuttal was released with concerns about the decisions made and them being in conflict with the high definition TV-X264 rule set. 
aAF called the rules unofficial nonsense and said that respected groups would not be following them. 
Only NOsegmenT and KICKOFF have released standard definition x264 sport rips under these rules.

The following year, a rule set for Xvid sports releases appeared: TXSRS10. Its aim is to improve the overall quality of sports releases while retaining the compatibility that Xvid provides. It should bring standardization and get rid of restrictions applicable to the ruleless world of TV-XVID. Twelve groups signed the standards, including two of the original five of the x264 rule set.

The SD x264 TV Releasing Standards 2012 also cover sport releases, making the previous standards obsolete.

High definition video

x264 for retail sources
The latest High Definition x264 Standard is Revision 4.0 from 2011. This ruleset targets HD DVD and Blu-ray sourced 720p and 1080p movie and TV-show rips. The releases are made available in a Matroska .mkv container, using the x264 encoder. The file size must be a multiple of 1120 MiB. 
It has become quite normal that non-English spoken movies are tagged with their language tag, even when they contain English subtitles. This is different for Xvid releases. This practice has been accepted by all nukenets, but it was never written down in an addendum to the ruleset. Also the usage of both Dutch and Flemish audio tracks in one release has become a practice.

There is a second ruleset from 2008 for x264 releases that has many similarities to the previous one, but it concentrates on BD5 and BD9 releases. 
The purpose of these releases is that the initial mkv file can be burned as a Blu-ray image to a single or double-layer DVD-R. The mkv file accompanying this kind of release is 200–300MB smaller than a similar release following the other ruleset due to the overhead of the Blu-ray image that will be created. 
Around May 2012, the stream of BD9 releases came to a halt. 2011 only had around thirty BD5 releases.

x264 for anime
On August 13, 2009, the first version of the standard was released. This standard is only a recommendation for anime from Blu-ray and its purpose is to improve quality over the then current HDX standard. The document reads that anime was always something special for the video codec experts at Doom9, as without anime there wouldn't be VirtualDub or many other video-related tools. This is why they decided to put out new standard to enjoy almost lossless anime quality.
The French scene had rules for anime releases years earlier. The latest French ruleset for anime is from 2011.

WMV

Because of the x264 scene, many people think WMV-HD is redundant. The authors of the first document think this is not true because of the compatibility WMV-HD provides. They write that the only reason many people are against WMV-HD, is because WMV is from Microsoft. In 2007 they wrote that it can be played on the Xbox 360 and HTPCs while x264 is restricted to HTPCs. They point out that many movie studios utilize the VC-1 codec for their retail BD-ROMs.

The changes in the 2008 ruleset were made because 1080p was getting more and more popular and the authors felt it was necessary to lower the 720p bitrate minimum as well to show x264 lovers WMV is equal quality. The video size wasn't determined by the length of the movie anymore, but by the minimum bitrate.

In the 2009 standards, a nuke section was added to govern the WMV-HD section. All nukes based on any other rules are unacceptable. Because all the groups releasing WMV-HD have agreed to and signed this rule set, they are the only ones who will develop, implement, and mandate the rules governing the WMV-HD section. The groups are IGUANA, NOVO, BamHD and INSECTS. SMeG was also added in later versions.

A special section for animated/anime titles was added in version 3.5 of the rule set.
Version 4.0 of the rule set had a large ascii art added and was the first to have no minimum or maximum file size requirement for the final WMV file. WMV-HD was from then on purely quality driven by minimum bitrate.
In version 4.1 the rule set was added that the group who releases an episode of a show first has exclusive rights to do the entire season of that show for a period of thirty days. This means that during those 30 days no other group can release an episode of the same show and season without being nuked.

The source for a WMV release must be HD DVD or Blu-ray. The audio has to be encoded to WMA 10 Pro and the video codec must be Windows Media 9 Advanced Profile (VC-1). A 720p resolution dupes 1080p but 1080p does not dupe 720p. The WMV file must be in stored in RAR with a recovery record. Compression is not allowed.

In 2013, at least ten new movie releases were seen, all released by the group INSECTS. This category died out in favor of x264 MKV releases, a format that is ubiquitous for non pornographic ripped video in 2016.

x264 for television sources

The first ever scene TV-x264 release, The.Unit.S01E04.HD720p.x264-MiRAGETV, was made by Spatula in early 2006. In May 2007, more than a year later, the first ruleset appeared. SAiNTS refused to sign this ruleset because it did not ban segmenting. According to them, this was the main reason for the crap releases in the HDTV scene. This first ruleset defined Matroska as the video container. A fixed file size for the resulting .mkv was used based on the shows length.

The 2011 standards first introduced CRF, instead of 2-pass based encoding. In April 2016, a total rewrite of the ruleset was released, addressing all known issues and patching loopholes.

In April 2012, QCF released the first 1080p x264 television ruleset shortly after one of their releases got nuked. 
The ruleset was nuked afterwards by LocalNet for one.group.does.not.make.a.ruleset.make_try.inviting.some.others.to.contribute. In December 2012, SYS agreed: "One group doesn't decide."
In September 2013, DEADPOOL had the following to say about the rules:

In April 2014, BATV announced they are dropping the INTERNAL tag: one group doesn't get to decide how we all release 1080p TV. A day later, BATV released the first 1080p HDTV x265 encode using that same episode for comparison. BATV thinks that 1080p is completely and utterly pointless unless done by a decent group. DIMENSION indicated they won't be using certain channels for 1080p captures due to insufficient quality.

x264 for WEB sources
In 2016, a new standard was introduced for web-sourced files, covering standard and high definition video. Web based streaming and video on-demand services have increased in popularity. They were initially used for missed broadcasts, but it evolved into a legitimate logo-free exclusive source for original content.

DVD-R
The scene requires DVD-Video releases to fit on a 4.7 GB DVD-R. Hence many released movies are not 1:1 copies of the retail DVDs. The latest standards revision is TDRS2K10. This ruleset appeared only two months after the 2009 ruleset, which has an addendum released to clarify a rule because of some confusion. The 2010 ruleset seems to have more similarities with TDRS2K5 than with the previous TDRS2K9 ruleset. According to the first nuke, the signing groups are crap. This resulted in a nukewar. Few days later, an addendum was released.

According to XeoN-VorTeX on October 31, 2002, a milestone in DVDR ripping was reached with the COMPLETE release of The Matrix. The DVD was generally regarded as the most complex DVD on the market. Only a movie only rip was available. The new rip included things such as the white rabbit.

Nowadays releases are in DVD5 or DVD9 size, have a menu available and are encoded with CCE.

BD-R
The scene requires BD-R releases to fit on a 25 GB single-layer Blu-ray Disc. Hence not all released movies are 1:1 copies of the retail Blu-rays, although those releases exist and are tagged COMPLETE.BLURAY.

Music video
The current Music video Council standard is version 6.0. X264 must be used in an mkv container in combination with an MP2, MP3, AC3, or DTS audio track.

Pornography

On November 15, 2012, the first XXX x264 SD standards were released. The movie file must not be split and an MP4 container must be used. The audio format is AAC. Xvid was used for standard definition rips the years before, just like DivX and SVCD, but did not have a ruleset. The groups Mirage and SMuT had their own list of rules they endorsed visible in their nfos. SMuT wrote: "We endorse the following XXX rules and encourage other groups/sites/scene members to insist they are followed also."

Standards for DVDR, paysite videos and imagesets have been released before.

Audio standards
Both MP3 and FLAC releases can optionally include M3U playlist files.

Lossy audio: MP3
At the start of the MP3 scene in 1995, there was little organization or standardization. Between 1999–2004, the pre-dominantly used MP3 encoding quality was 192 kbit/s at 44.1 kHz, which was nominal for the hardware and software encoding available at the time. This improved as computers got faster and the LAME MP3 encoder developed into its later versions.

Due to broad support in hardware devices, unauthorized audio material is usually released in MP3 files at VBR quality. In 2007, new rules put forth that it is recommended to encode all files with Lame 3.97, using the "-V2 --vbr-new" switch. Other formats such as AAC or Vorbis are currently not allowed.

In 2009, new rules were introduced.  Homemade releases are forbidden.  Every release needs an ID3 v1.1 AND ID3 v2 tag.  Extra material that is available on the source material is allowed to be released. Flash storage mediums are allowed as sources to accommodate some retail releases made exclusively in those formats.

The early MP3 release groups, 1996–1997, were considered "lamers", bottom feeders. In 2000, the former leader of Rabid Neurosis, Al Capone, posted a letter to the scene on the RNS website, complaining how the mp3 scene became more like the warez scene during its first 4 years.

Lossless audio: FLAC

An early scene release came in 2004 when the group ARA released Metallica's fifth performance in Gothenburg as FLAC files. These lossless files can be bought on LiveMetallica.com, a service that allows fans to buy and download files of soundboard recordings. From 2007 on some early FLAC releases came from justice, a group that already used APE for lossless music the years before. That same year the Polish group BFPMP3 thought to start promoting the FLAC standard with some internal releases. Single purpose groups such as judge, FLACH or CDDA created only a handful of releases in the years before the first ruleset.

On October 2, 2011, the scene introduced a FLAC category by releasing a first ruleset.  Eight days later an updated revision was released. According to the documents, the ruleset was created to satisfy the long lasting audiophile's demand for a music scene of higher quality than LAME mpeg compression encoding and because space and bandwidth were able to accommodate more. To avoid previously made mistakes in the music scene, a group of elder sceners gathered to decide upon the rules. A common understanding amongst all was that material from non-physical media can easily be of doubtful origin of source and hence of questionable quality. The rules consider only physical media as a valid source and they must be followed very strictly. A lot of releases are being nuked for various cosmetic flaws.

Early 2016, anonymous sceners voiced a concern that nukers lack technical understanding to nuke improperly ripped vinyl sources and showed examples of how the ruleset gets twisted or misinterpreted for minor issues. The release got nuked within the hour after pre by ZoNeNET with just invalid.proper as reason. In June later that year, 4 years after version 2.0, a new ruleset was made to address misinterpretations in the wording and to update some rules.

In response to version 3 of the rules, a scene notice called the rules invalid because it was not created by leading groups in the section or a council. It also pointed out that its block on WEB and PROMO releases causes a void due to the digital only distribution of many originals. The group CUSTODES mentioned in their farewell message that the FLAC ruleset isn't professional enough to archive music in the best quality possible.

Software standards

Applications
Application releases are usually split in two different categories, 0-day and ISO apps. Categories originating from or still being put into 0-day are for example PDA, EBOOK or XXX-IMAGESET. 0-day (pronounced zero day) refers to any copyrighted work that has been released the same day as the original product, or sometimes even before. 
It is considered a mark of skill among warez distro groups to crack and distribute a program on the same day of its commercial release.

0-day applications are usually 150 MB or smaller, but can be 5 GB or larger as long as they are not CD/DVD images. The release format allows almost anything in 0-day section, but often 0day releases are cracks or keygens for different applications or small games with size varying from 1–50 MB. Sometimes e-books, imagesets, fonts or mobile software are released as 0-day. Executable programs such as keygens and cracks are often compressed with the open source UPX packer.

LineZer0 indicated in the nfo file of their 20,000th release that they will change their packing ways to RAR/SFV and put the old ZIP/RAR/DIZ packaging to rest by the first of April 2012. They strongly encouraged other groups to do the same. After some threats to release information on individuals, Lz0 returned to the old packaging ways for the time being until a new ruleset can be put in place.

The Minor Update (MU) rule is unique to 0-day releases. It makes sure that each month not more than one release of the same application is released. Major updates do not follow this rule. The exception to the rule happens when a group motivates in their NFO that the changes are considered to be a major update. For example the group Unleashed choose to ignore the MU rule for a hotfix, making a less blurry game available two weeks sooner.

PDA rules require folder naming to define which application and version the release contains. Also required are CPU type, operating system and cracktype. Optional information such as language is expected, if the release is non-English. Packaging follows 0day guidelines. Generally lax security, simple programming and small filesizes make mobile software an attractive target for infringers. In more recent times it covers other portable devices such as iPod, iPhone, iPad or systems running Android.

ISO applications are usually either in BIN/CUE or ISO format. Allowed media is CD and DVD, but release can be smaller than the media size. Applications are required to contain working key or keygen to generate valid serial. Patch cracking is also required, which is used to bypass hardware protection, such as serial or USB dongle.
Some groups signed a Sample CD Scene Protocol for better quality sample discs.

Game rips
This is the scene for game releases that are changed to minimize the size of the distributed files. A first ten point document was made by "The Faction" in 1998. The grouping that created the rules that should be adhered to, and the rules themselves, were disbanded the following year. The NSA rules, or "the new rules", outlines the codes of conduct regarding game ripping. Releasing can be done in two fields: games and applications. It can also be done in two ways: it is possible to release disc images or groups can "rip". In the process of ripping, groups remove things such as introductory movies, multiple texture modes, big sound files and the like.

Games
The game must fit on CDs or DVDs, and the format should be either BIN/CUE, or ISO, respectively. Some sites allow CCD images too, as defined in the site's rules. Media descriptor files (MDF/MDS) seem to be permitted now as well. A draft version of Standard ISO Rules (S.I.R.) 2010 was included in TGSC #43. 

At the start of 2021 a new ruleset for PC games became active: After approximately 20 years without new, written rules for the PC games section the leading Game ISO groups assembled to collaborate on a long overdue modernization. A game must be authored into an ISO file when created for Microsoft Windows, but releases for other operating systems may use a .dmg Apple Disk Image file or even skip the image file altogether before packaging in RARs. A limited time exclusivity right for game updates is introduced to the group that wins the race. Digital distribution of games causes the amount of updates to increase considerably which results in little new data and a lot of duplicate content in the game updates. During this 60 day window it's at the group's discretion to join these updates as they see fit. Outside the Scene repacked games are in high demand. FitGirl, one of the leading names in this niche, often uses the scene release as source to create a better compressed version to save considerable bandwidth.

DOX
DOX is an abbreviation of documents or documentation (manuals). This category includes video game add-ons such as No-CDs, cracked updates, keygens, covers, trainers or cheat codes. DOX releases are amongst the rarest releases in the scene. This is due to their small size. In October 2007, TNT (The Nova Team) noted in the nfo of their 750th release that only the groups DEViANCE and FAiRLiGHT managed to reach the same amount of DOX releases.

Console standards
The console scene survived decades without rules. In 2009, a first set of rules for the PS2, Xbox 360 and the Wii was released. It's remarkable that a release must be pred no later than 30 days after retail date. Besides the 0-day standards, most other rulesets nowadays don't have such limitations. An example of a ruleset that did have such a limitation would be the deprecated TDX 2000 ruleset, but in the subsequent ruleset (TDX2k1) this limitation was removed. There are no written standards for the other console scenes. The first games released on a certain platform are often not playable because the console isn't cracked at the time.

Nintendo 64
On January 25, 1997, the first game released for the N64 was Super Mario 64 by the group Anthrox and the console division of Swat. The games are released as one zipfile following the old traditional 8.3 naming convention. No folders were used. The ROM extensions ".v64" and ".z64" were used as naming conventions. Shortly before the closure of 64dd.net in January 2015, there were 883 releases numbered on the site. The last releases listed were done by the group Carrot in 2012.

Dreamcast

On June 23, 2000, the first ripped Dreamcast game, Dead or Alive 2, was released by Utopia., this was a CDRWIN ISO image (bin/cue) like in the PC game ISO scene. The day before, Utopia released a Dreamcast BootCD that was capable of booting copies and imports on a non-chipped standard consumer model. Less than two months later, when Kalisto released the first self bootable game, Dynamite Cop, the game was a Padus DiscJuggler (CDI) image. Later that month, the first copy protected game, Ultimate Fighting Championship, was released by Kalisto. Almost all releases that followed were released as a CDI image and thus became the de facto standard. When Kalisto announced their retirement in the DC scene, they had released more than 66% of all Dreamcast releases. Two days later, a new group called Echelon picked up where Kalisto left off. This group released Evil Twin: Cyprien's Chronicles their 188th and last Dreamcast game release on April 30, 2002. On October 12, 2000, PARADOX, another big and respected scene group, released the first trainer for the Dreamcast. Two weeks after that, they released their first game, Shadowman, for the Dreamcast console with an intro just to prove that we can do neat DC releases as well. Besides games and dox, also emulators and Linux distros were released in the DC scene.

Xbox
Xbox releases are by convention in the XISO format, a slight modification of the DVD ISO format. DVDRips of Xbox games were released so they could fit on a single CD. A lot of the first Xbox games were released by the group ProjectX on May 3, 2002. These first releases worked on a developer Xbox, but if it would be playable on retail versions was unknown at the time because no modchips existed yet.
There are more than 4400 Xbox releases released in the scene.

PlayStation 2
PlayStation 2 releases must be in standard DVD ISO format. PARADOX was the first group to do PS2 and PS2 DVD rips, but later on they were the ones motivating the scene to release full DVD ISOs.

GameCube
On June 12, 2003, the first game for the Nintendo GameCube, The Legend of Zelda: The Wind Waker, was released by STARCUBE.
As of May 2016, there are more than 3100 NGC releases released in the scene.

Xbox 360
On December 8, 2005, the first full game for the Xbox 360 was released in the scene by the warez group PI. Need for Speed: Most Wanted was the first of a batch of three games released that day by PI. A couple of minutes before that, they released an open source tool to extract Xbox 360 dumps.
As of January 2017, there are more than 6700 Xbox 360 releases released in the scene.

The image of the Xbox 360 game is a .iso with a .dvd file. The rars are split to volumes of 50 MB for DVD5 disks or 100 MB for DVD9 disks and must use compression.

PlayStation 3
On November 25, 2006, PARADOX released the first PS3 ISO. The PS3 ISOs are now fully playable on a jailbroken PS3. As of January 2017, there were more than 4,800 PS3 releases in the scene.

A first ruleset for the PlayStation 3 section was released on June 10, 2011.
 
Shortly afterwards it was voided in classic scene style: "These rules dont mean shit you asshats." 
and the original rules were nuked for inadequate.and.unnecessary.ruleset_not.signed.by.all.listed.groups_see.Response.to.The.Official.PlayStation3.Ruleset.2011.PS3. A new "VOID" ruleset was released the day after and was nuked for no.valid.rebuttal.given_not.all.grps.need.to.sign_follow.the.new.ruleset. 
The better response followed a couple of days later.

Wii
Wii releases must be in standard DVD ISO format. The rar archives must use compression. PARADOX released the first Wii image on December 12, 2006. The game was Red Steel.

On April 14, 2008, BlaZe was the first group to release a Virtual Console title. This emulated SNES Donkey Kong Country 2: Diddy's Kong Quest finally had a proper dump after its fourth release more than a year later. These DLC releases are tagged VC or WiiWare and exist of a packed WAD file. A large amount of these first releases were nuked. The main nuke reason was modified.ticket.info. Example:. Dupe or bad dump are other common reasons to receive a nuke. Another reason would be not trucha signed resulting not to be able to install.

In January 2017, more than 7800 releases for the Wii were released in the scene.

Wii U
On May 3, 2013, the group VENOM released the first game for the Wii U: Marvel Avengers: Battle for Earth. The disk image is a .iso file in Wii U Optical Disc format (WUOD), Nintendo's proprietary disc format for the Wii U. Like other console scene firsts, the game isn't playable on the console yet. This first scene release was a few days after the Wii U was announced to be allegedly hacked by the mod chip developer WiiKey. Based on the file date of the RAR archives, VENOM had already created the ISO file more than a month before pre. This is the point in time when they first made the files available within the scene through their affiliated sites.
Later, Venom's Release was found to be a bad dump, so the real first Wii U game dumped was by PoWeRUp, which has been confirmed as PROPER.

Xbox One
On November 19, 2013, a couple of days before the official console launch date, the group COMPLEX released the first game for the Xbox One: Call of Duty: Ghosts. The release contained a 42GB .iso file without the security sectors. The file system format of the disk is XGD4 (Xbox Game Data 4).

PlayStation 4

On May 31, 2014, the group WaYsTeD brought the first PlayStation 4 game to the scene: Watch Dogs. Just like with other console firsts, the 25GB .iso file is not currently playable. It has the same file structure as the PlayStation 3 games. Within two months, some other groups started doing raw image dumps too. More than 3 years later on September 27, 2017, the group KOTF (Knights of the Fallen) released Grand Theft Auto V as the first playable decrypted game dump, DARKSiDERS on PC GAMES section are saying that this KOTF release would not been possible without them. As KOTF did not had good enough topsite at the time, sites IRC channel announced pre as: "DARKSiDERS RELEASED Grand.Theft.Auto.V.READNFO.PS4-KOTF". As the game was released from the DARKSiDERS pre directory, the release was given to DARKSiDERS on behalf of KOTF. Its though unclear how these groups are related, but many in the Scene remember that pre announcement mentioning also DARKSiDERS to the confusion of many. Among the first releases were games such as Assassin's Creed IV and Far Cry 4, with RAR volumes of 250MB and even 500MB sized parts. The outdated firmware that was required to play these games was a major drawback.

Handheld standards
A handheld game console is a lightweight, portable electronic device with a built-in screen, game controls, speakers and replaceable and or rechargeable batteries or battery pack. Handheld game consoles are run on machines of small size allowing people to carry them and play them at any time or place. Unlike video game consoles, the controls, screen and speakers are all part of a single unit.

Game Boy Advance
Game Boy Advance releases are in their native ROM format (.gba). However, like the 0day releases, due to their small size, these are often compressed into RAR files and then compressed into ZIP format; otherwise, they are simply compressed into ZIP format.

Nintendo DS
The Nintendo DS scene started out as an extension of the Game Boy Advance scene, and carried forward with mostly the same set of rules. On May 31, 2010, a first ruleset was released with the goal of establishing a clear and concise listing of what should be expected of a valid Nintendo DS release. "Having an official list to reference should prevent needless nuking, and clean up what is at present a cluttered and confused scene." 7 groups signed the rules. The day after, a second "official" ruleset was released but was nuked later on, although it is deemed to be the most relevant according to scenerules.irc.gs. Multiple of the 18 groups listed did not agree to sign the rules. A scene notice has been released by "Concerned Retired NDS/GBA Scene Founding Members" concerning the issue of the two rulesets.

Nintendo DS releases are in their native ROM format (.neo or .nds). The Scene has been doing .zip from the GBA days, but now the releases need to be compressed into 5 MB split RAR volumes and contain a Nintendo DS title or a patch for a Nintendo DS title. Also an NFO file is a must. A patch is some modification or tool like a trainer, crack, language selector or save fix. The most common formats are .BDF and .IPS. The directory name must include the text "NDS" and the group name. DSi related releases are regarded as NDS releases and must have the tag DSi.

See also DS Scene and DS Piracy on pocketheaven.com for more background and history.

Nintendo 3DS
Nintendo 3DS releases use the .3ds file format or the .cia file format. The group LEGACY (LGC) released the first three games on June 5, 2011. They included a picture of the dumper they used. The packaging is done with compressed RAR files and an SFV for verification. As of October 2017, there are more than 2400 3DS releases.

PSP

Sony PSP releases are by convention specified as FULL UMD or UMD RIP, meaning some parts were removed either out of non-necessity, or to fit it to a certain-sized memory stick. You can play an ISO with custom firmware or an emulator such as devhook. PARADOX released the first retail PSP game on May 4, 2005. In December 2006, the scene started releasing old PSX games that can be played with the official emulator on the PSP. These games are bought from the PlayStation Store with a PS3. Depending on the releasegroup, they are tagged PSXPSP, PSX_PSP, PSX.To.PSP, PSX.FOR.PSP or PS1_For_PSP. On May 19, 2006, PARADOX returned to the PSP scene to release a +9 trainer just to prove that trainers for Sony's handheld are possible. Since then, no other group or person has publicly released any trainers. See also PSP Scene and PSP Piracy on pocketheaven.com for more background and history.

Unlike the games, there are standards for how to release movies for the PSP. All the releases must be in the MP4/THM format. Retail movies released for the PSP are tagged UMDMovie. When the first UMDMovie was released in September 2005, there wasn't a way to play it yet. Because Sony killed the format, the UMDMovie releases came to a halt in May 2007. 3 years later the group ABSTRAKT released some more UMD Movies.

PlayStation Vita

The first game release for the PlayStation Vita in the scene, Uncharted: Golden Abyss, was done by the group PSiCO on February 8, 2016. This was almost 4 years after the introduction of the PS Vita in Europe and North America. It was dumped from a PS Vita NVG game cartridge and the PFS encryption layer was removed since this data is not needed to become playable in the future. Releases are tagged with PSV in the directory name. There were already a handful of other PSV tagged releases before, but these contained covers.

The first releases were made to be used with the Cobra BlackFin dongle for the PlayStation Vita handheld, using the .psv (BlackFin) format for its data dump. After the release of the Vitamin dumper in August 2016 following the HENkaku homebrew enabler, there weren't many new releases immediately after because of issues with this new tool. A couple of weeks later the first ruleset was signed by 4 groups. The best tool to make a copy of the game cartridge data at that moment was MaiDumpTool in combination with Vitamin 2.0 when needed. The file format used for these newer dumps is .vpk: a ZIP containing the decrypted files of the game folder.

Other

Other handheld platforms that had games released by the Scene include Neo Geo Pocket, Neo Geo Pocket Color, WonderSwan, WonderSwan Color, Tapwave Zodiac, Gizmondo, Game Boy, Game Boy Color, and N-Gage.

E-books 

The first traceable scene release of an e-book can be dated back to around the year 2000. In 2008, sUppLeX wrote in one of their NFOs that "ebooks do not really belong to 0day anymore, so we definitely need rules for that. Most countries got their own rules for the local ebook section in their country, but there's nothing similar for the whole world." sUppLeX were releasing their ebooks in RAR/SFV format at that time, but reverted two years later.
Standards existed for the German and Polish ebook scenes.	
In 2009, a new ruleset for German e-books was created, which closely matches general rules for English releases and which since has been adopted in most e-book releases. There was the option to choose between ZIP/DIZ or RAR/SFV to package a release.

In 2012, international ebook rules were created. It was a unified agreement applicable to all groups to ensure high quality ebook releases. In 2022 an updated version of the rules was published. DRM-protection has to be removed prior to release and only the 0day ZIP/DIZ packaging can be used. Some examples showing naming conventions:

 Magazine.Name.Year.Month.LANGUAGE.SOURCE.eBOOk-GROUPTAG
 Journal.Name.Vol.xx.No.xx.Month.Year.LANGUAGE.SOURCE.COMiC.eBOOk-GROUPTAG (also for comics)
 Book.Title.xxth.Edition.Year.LANGUAGE.SOURCE.eBOOk-GROUPTAG

 xx stands for a number: volume, issue number or edition
 SOURCE may be SCAN for scanned documents or RETAiL for commercially available e-documents

Allowed file formats are PDF, EPUB, Kindle (.azw, .kf8) and Mobipocket (.prc, .mobi).

See also
 ARJ

Rulesets

References

External links 
 Largest collection of known scene rules
 How to package a Scene release?
 Music rules of the now defunct What.CD torrent tracker

Warez
Standards